Ella McMahon (born 1 April 1994), known professionally as Ella Eyre, is a British singer and songwriter. She is known for her collaborations with Rudimental on their UK number-one single "Waiting All Night" (2013), which won the 2014 Brit Award for British Single of the Year, with DJ Fresh on his single "Gravity" (2015), and with Sigala on his singles "Came Here for Love" (2017) and "Just Got Paid" (2018). Her debut EP, Deeper, was released in 2013 and her debut album, Feline, was released in 2015. Eyre's musical influences include Lauryn Hill, Etta James, Basement Jaxx and Hans Zimmer.

Early life and education 
Eyre was born on 1 April 1994 and was raised in Ealing, West London. Her father was Jamaican and her mother is Maltese. Her father was a chef who lived in his home country of Jamaica, his health too poor to travel to the UK, and her mother, who raised Eyre in London, is a cake designer. Eyre trained as a competitive swimmer before she began singing professionally.

Eyre was educated at Millfield School, a public school in Somerset; refuting the idea that she came from a privileged background, she observed that her mother could not have afforded the fees, and she went there on a "massive swimming scholarship". She later attended the BRIT School for Performing Arts and Technology, where she studied musical theatre. Discovered by her management through a vocal coach in 2011, McMahon juggled school with songwriting. She signed to the publisher Warner/Chappell Music in July 2012 and a record deal with Virgin EMI followed shortly after.

Music career

2012–2016: Breakthrough and Feline 
In December 2012, Eyre featured on Bastille's cover and mash up of TLC's "No Scrubs" and the xx's "Angels". Titled "No Angels", the song featured on the band's 2012 mixtape, Other People's Heartache, Pt. 2. In April 2013, she featured on drum and bass band Rudimental's single "Waiting All Night", which peaked at number one on the UK Singles Chart, becoming Eyre's first chart entry. In August 2013, she appeared alongside rapper Wiz Khalifa on the track "Think About It" from producer Naughty Boy's 2013 album Hotel Cabana. The song was released as the fourth single from the album in November 2013. Eyre also features on rapper Tinie Tempah's album Demonstration on the track "Someday (Place in the Sun)", which entered the UK Singles Chart at number 87 but was never released as a single.

Eyre's first EP, Deeper, was released in December 2013, and the title track reached number 72. She was the runner-up for the 2014 BRIT Critics' Choice Award and came second on the BBC Sound of 2014 shortlist. Her next three solo singles—"If I Go", "Comeback" (both 2014) and "Together" (2015)—reached the top twenty on the UK Singles Chart. She co-wrote the UK number one single "Changing" for drum and bass duo Sigma featuring British recording artist Paloma Faith, which was released in the United Kingdom in September 2014. The following month, Eyre won Best Newcomer at the MOBO Awards 2014.

Eyre featured on the DJ Fresh single "Gravity", released in February 2015. In May 2015, a song Eyre co-wrote, "Black Smoke", was used by Ann Sophie, the German participant of the Eurovision Song Contest 2015. Also during mid 2015, Eyre supported Olly Murs on his 2015 arena tour and was announced as the "face" of the advertising campaign for an Emporio Armani Diamonds fragrance. Her debut album, Feline, was released in August 2015 (following the single "Good Times") and features contributions from Wayne Hector, Ilya, Paul O'Duffy and Jarrad Rogers. In September, Eyre released a cover of "Swing Low, Sweet Chariot" in association with England Rugby, to coincide with the 2015 Rugby World Cup. In November, Eyre won Best Female at the MOBO Awards 2015. She then embarked on a UK tour. In 2016, she appeared on Drive.

2017–present: Forthcoming second studio album 
On 18 February 2017, Eyre announced her comeback concert at KOKO, London on 4 April 2017. At the comeback concert at KOKO, Eyre performed four new songs: "LOV(E)", "Drink with Your Name on It", "I Swear" and "Ego". On 29 May 2017, Eyre and Sigala announced a new collaborative single, "Came Here for Love", released on 9 June 2017. As of 29 June the official YouTube video has over 2.5 million views and 11 million streams on Spotify. On 31 July 2017, Eyre announced her new single 'Ego' featuring Ty Dolla $ign, released on 11 August 2017. Eyre supported Little Mix on their Summer Shout Out Tour and supported The Script on their "Freedom Child Tour" in early 2018. When supporting The Script, Eyre promoted a new song called "Answerphone" yet to be released.

In February 2018, Eyre was confirmed for the celebrity version of the Great British Bake Off 2018. On 5 March 2018, Eyre announced her new single "Answerphone" with Banx & Ranx which features Yxng Bane which was released on 16 March and peaked at number 5 on the UK Chart. On 20 June 2018, Eyre teased, whilst in Copenhagen, a new song on her social media. On 7 September 2018, Eyre released another collaboration with Sigala called "Just Got Paid" featuring Meghan Trainor and French Montana. It peaked at Number 11 on the UK Chart.

In July 2019, Eyre announced she had signed to Island Records. She subsequently released her new single titled "Mama" featuring Banx & Ranx and Kiana Ledé.

In January 2020, Eyre released her new single "New Me", with a following UK tour in November and December the same year. Following the release of "New Me", Eyre announced the release of her third single from her second studio album, "L.O.V.(e)", to be released on 8 May 2020, having been performed numerous times prior to release and has been noted as a 'fan favourite'. Following this, Eyre dropped the singles "Dreams" featuring Yxng Bane and "Careless", before dropping her extended play "Quarter Life Crisis" in August 2020.

Personal life 
In February 2017, Eyre and Lewi Morgan, from the British pop rock band Rixton, ended their two-year relationship. A week after the comeback show at KOKO in April 2017, Eyre announced the death of her father.

Eyre revealed she suffered from a kidney infection during the making of her 'New Me' music video.

Discography 

 Feline (2015)

Tours 
Headlining:
Feline Tour (2014–15)
2021 UK Tour (2021) – rescheduled from June 2020 due to coronavirus.

Supporting:
Never Been Better Tour (2015) 
Summer Shout Out (2017) 
Freedom Child Tour (2018) (The Script)

Awards and nominations

References

External links 

 Official website
 Elite London

1994 births
Living people
Brit Award winners
Electronic dance music musicians
English people of Jamaican descent
English people of Maltese descent
British contemporary R&B singers
English women singer-songwriters
English drum and bass musicians
English soul singers
21st-century Black British women singers
People educated at Millfield
People educated at the BRIT School
People from Ealing
Singers from London
Virgin Records artists
English women pop singers
Neo soul singers